Journey Continued: An Autobiography is the second part of Alan Paton's autobiography, the first being Towards the Mountain. Paton had completed the writing and correction of the volume, but he died before its publication in 1988.

Topics

The book addresses a wide variety of topics, personal, professional, philosophical, and political. For example, it discusses the way in which Paton's Cry, The Beloved Country was adapted for Broadway, but it also discusses the Christian basis for Paton's activism.

Journey Continued outlines long Paton's and deep involvement with the Liberal Party of South Africa, and his views on liberalism and its distinctness from other political philosophies.

Quotations

References

1988 non-fiction books
Books about activists
Books about liberalism
Books published posthumously
Liberalism in South Africa
Literary memoirs
20th-century South African literature